Rossiya Tournament 1988 in bandy was played in Abakan during the period of 26-31 January 1990, and was won by the Soviet Union. The United States played for the first time and was the first transatlantic team ever in the tournament.

This year's Rossiya Tournament began with a group stage and then had a final between the two best teams to decide the final winner, with the third and fourth teams playing a third place consolation game.

Results of group stage

Knock-out stage

Match for third place
 -  11-2

Final
 -  4-3

References

 Norges herrlandskamper i bandy
 Sverige-Sovjet i bandy
 Rossijaturneringen

1988 in Soviet sport
1988 in bandy
1988